Imagix 4D is a source code analysis tool from Imagix Corporation, used primarily for understanding, documenting, and evolving existing C, C++ and Java software.

Applied technologies include full semantic source analysis. Software visualization supports program comprehension. Static data flow analysis-based verifications detect problems in variable usage, task interactions and concurrency.  Software metrics measure design quality and identify potential testing and maintenance issues.

See also
 Rational Rose
 Rigi
 Software visualization
 List of tools for static code analysis
 Sourcetrail

References

Use inside SEI's ARMIN Architecture Reconstruction and Mining Tool
Use inside Bosch's Model-Centric Software Architecture Reconstruction

External links
Imagix Corp. website

Code navigation tools
Static program analysis tools
Software metrics
Documentation generators